Yang Zhuo is a Chinese former Wushu fighter and current kickboxer who competes in both Featherweight and Lightweight division. A multiple time provincial and national Sanshou titlist in his home country. Yang later made the switch to kickboxing. As of 1 November 2018, he is ranked the #8 featherweight in the world by Combat Press.

Yang Zhuo began sanshou training at an early age and rose to prominence by winning provincial titles in his native Liaoning several years consecutively. In the summer of 2009, he began to fight in Wu Lin Feng.

Career 

On October 26, 2014, in the Kunlun Fight 12 4-Man 65 kg tournament semifinals, Yang beat Matt Embree by decision. He won the final against Phosa Nopphorn by TKO.

On July 4, 2015, in Wu Lin Feng World Championship 2015 – 67 kg Tournament Semi Finals, Yang beat Jomthong Chuwattana by Ex.R decision.

In the final he faced Qiu jianliang and in the second round Yang knocked Qiu down several times, almost finishing him. Yang then won a unanimous decision victory from the judges.

Championships and awards 

Kickboxing
2017 Kunlun Fight 16-Man 66kg tournament champion
2015 WLF World Championship Tournament −67 kg champion -67 kg
2014 Wu Lin Feng World champion -67 kg
2014 Kunlun Fight 4-Man 65 kg tournament champion -65 kg
Ranking
N°8 Combat Press.com at Featherweight, June, 2018

Kickboxing record

|-  style="background:#fbb;"
| 2021-09-25 || Loss || align=left| Wacharalek || Wu Lin Feng 2021: WLF in Tangshan  || Tangshan, China ||  Decision ||3  ||3:00

|-  style="text-align:center; background:#fbb;"
| 2019-01-19 || Loss ||align=left| Petchtanong Banchamek ||Wu Lin Feng 2019: WLF World Cup 2018-2019 Final Semi Finals  || Haikou, China || Decision (Unanimous) || 3 || 3:00
|-
|-  style="text-align:center; background:#cfc;"
| 2018-12-01 || Win ||align=left| Andrei Kulebin || Wu Lin Feng -67kg World Cup 2018-2019 Group D || Zhengzhou, China || Decision (Split) || 3 || 3:00
|-
|-  style="text-align:center; background:#cfc;"
| 2018-10-06 || Win ||align=left| Hu Yafei || Wu Lin Feng 2018: WLF -67kg World Cup 2018-2019 4th Round || Shangqiu, China || Decision (Unanimous) || 3 || 3:00
|-
|-  style="text-align:center; background:#cfc;"
| 2018-08-04 || Win ||align=left| Sergey Kosykh || Wu Lin Feng 2018: WLF -67kg World Cup 2018-2019 2nd Round || Zhengzhou, China || Decision (Unanimous) || 3 || 3:00
|-
|-  style="text-align:center; background:#cfc;"
| 2018-04-07 || Win ||align=left| Alex Bublea ||Wu Lin Feng 2018: World Championship Shijiazhuang || Shijiazhuang, China || Decision (Unanimous) || 3 || 3:00
|-
|-  style="text-align:center; background:#cfc;"
| 2018-02-03 || Win ||align=left| Jonathan Tuhu || Wu Lin Feng 2018: World Championship in Shenzhen || Shenzhen, China || Decision (Unanimous) || 3 || 3:00
|-
|-  style="text-align:center; background:#cfc;"
| 2018-01-20 || Win ||align=left| Hussein Manşūrī || EM-Legend|| Yuxi, China || TKO || 3 ||
|-
|-  style="text-align:center; background:#cfc;"
| 2017-11-12 || Win ||align=left| Singdam Kiatmuu9 || Kunlun Fight 67 - 66kg World Championship, Final || Sanya, China || Decision (2-1) || 3 || 3:00 
|-
! style=background:white colspan=9 |Wins the Kunlun Fight 16 Man 66kg Tournament 
|- 
|-  style="text-align:center; background:#cfc;"
| 2017-11-12 || Win ||align=left| David Mejia || Kunlun Fight 67 - 66kg World Championship, Semi Finals || Sanya, China || Decision (Unanimous) || 3 || 3:00 
|-
|-  style="text-align:center; background:#cfc;"
| 2017-11-12 || Win ||align=left| Wei Ninghui || Kunlun Fight 67 - 66kg World Championship, Quarter Finals || Sanya, China || Decision (Majority) || 3 || 3:00 
|-
|-  style="text-align:center; background:#cfc;"
| 2017-10-14 || Win || align="left| Ouail Karroumi || Wu Lin Feng 2017: World Championship Hong Kong || Hong Kong, China || Decision (Unanimous) || 3 || 3:00
|-
|-  style="text-align:center; background:#cfc;"
| 2017-09-03 || Win || align="left| Adrian Pețenchea || Wu Lin Feng 2017: World Championship Xi'an || Zhengzhou, China || Decision (Unanimous) || 3 || 3:00
|-
|-  style="text-align:center; background:#cfc;"
| 2017-08-27 || Win || align=left| Kenta || Kunlun Fight 65 - Kunlun Fight 16 Man Tournament 66 kg-1/8 finals || Qingdao, China || Decision (Unanimous) || 3 || 3:00 
|-
|-  style="text-align:center; background:#cfc;"
| 2017-08-05 || Win || align="left| Ratchasing || Wu Lin Feng 2017: China VS Thailand || Zhengzhou, China || Decision (Unanimous) || 3 || 3:00
|-
|-  style="text-align:center; background:#cfc;"
| 2017-07-15 || Win ||align=left| Lindon Wotton || Wu Lin Feng 2017: Australia VS China || Sydney, Australia || Decision (Unanimous) || 3 || 3:00 
|-
|-  style="text-align:center; background:#cfc;"
| 2017-06-03 || Win ||align=left| Fumiya Kato ||Wu Lin Feng 2017: China VS Japan || Changsha, China || Decision (Unanimous) || 3 || 3:00 
|-
|-  style="text-align:center; background:#cfc;"
| 2017-05-16 || Win ||align=left| Jason Hinds || Wu Lin Feng 2017: East VS West || Toronto, Canada || Decision (Split) || 3 || 3:00
|-
|-  style="text-align:center; background:#fbb;"
| 2017-04-17 || Loss || align=left| Li Yinggang || 2017 Chinese kickboxing Championship || Shenzhen, China || Decision (Unanimous) || 3 || 3:00
|-
|-  style="text-align:center; background:#cfc;"
| 2017-04-01 || Win ||align=left| Rafik Habiat || Wu Lin Feng 2017: China VS Europe || Zhengzhou, China || Decision (Unanimous) || 3 || 3:00 
|-
|-  style="text-align:center; background:#cfc;"
| 2017-01-14 || Win ||align=left| Charles François || Glory of Heroes 6: Genesis || Jiyuan, China || Decision (Unanimous) || 3 || 3:00 
|-
|-  style="text-align:center; background:#cfc;"
| 2016-12-03 || Win ||align=left| Waki Mitauharu || Wu Lin Feng 2016: WLF x Krush - China vs Japan|| Zhengzhou, China || Decision (Unanimous) || 3 || 3:00 
|-
|-  style="text-align:center; background:#cfc;"
| 2016-10-29 || Win ||align=left| Socratis Kerpatsi || Rise of Heroes 3 || Changji, China || KO || 1 || 
|-
|-  style="text-align:center; background:#cfc;"
| 2016-10-01 || Win || align=left| Luis Passos || Glory of Heroes 5 || Zhengzhou, China || Decision (Unanimous) || 3 || 3:00 
|-
|-  style="text-align:center; background:#fbb;"
| 2016-07-02 || Loss || align=left| Fabio Pinca || Glory of Heroes 3 || Jiyuan, China || Decision (Split) || 3 || 3:00 
|-
|-  style="text-align:center; background:#fbb;"
| 2016-05-07 || Loss || align=left| Massaro Glunder || Glory of Heroes 2 || Shenzhen, China || Decision (Split) || 3 || 3:00 
|-
|-  style="text-align:center; background:#fbb;"
| 2016-04-10 || Loss || align=left| Socratis Kerpatsi || Wu Lin Feng & Gods of War 8 || Marousi, Greece || Decision (Split) || 3 || 3:00
|-
|-  style="text-align:center; background:#cfc;"
| 2016-01-23 || Win || align=left| Craig Dickson || Wu Lin Feng 2016: World Kickboxing Championship in Shanghai || Shanghai, China || KO (right hook) || 1 ||
|-
|-  style="text-align:center; background:#cfc;"
| 2015-12-26 || Win || align=left| Craig Dickson || ACC fighting champion || Quanzhou, China || Decision (Unanimous) || 3 || 3:00 
|-
|-  style="text-align:center; background:#fbb;"
| 2015-12-05 || Loss || align=left| Phayaluang Cho.hapayak || Wu Lin Feng King's Cup 2015 Celebrating the King's Birthday || Bangkok, Thailand || Decision (Unanimous) || 3 || 3:00 
|-
! style=background:white colspan=9 |Fight was for S1 Muaythai Welterweight Intercontinental Champion.
|-  style="text-align:center; background:#cfc;"
| 2015-11-10 || Win || align=left| Matt Theos || Wu Lin Feng & WCK Muaythai: China vs USA || Las Vegas, Nevada, USA || Decision (Unanimous) || 3 || 3:00 
|-
|-  style="text-align:center; background:#cfc;"
| 2015-10-28 || Win || align=left| Takeshita || KOF.MTK || Nanjing, China || KO || 2 ||
|-
|-  style="text-align:center; background:#cfc;"
| 2015-10-14 || Win || align=left| Maurice Lohner || Wu Lin Feng 2015 || Hong Kong, China || Decision (Unanimous) || 3 || 3:00
|-
|-  style="text-align:center; background:#cfc;"
| 2015-08-22 || Win || align=left| Tyjani Beztati || Wu Lin Feng 2015 || Xiamen, China || Decision (Unanimous) || 3 || 3:00
|-
|-  style="text-align:center; background:#cfc;"
| 2015-08-01 || Win || align=left| Ruth Edmonton || Wu Lin Feng 2015 || Zhengzhou, China || TKO (3 knockdowns) || 1 ||
|-
|-  style="text-align:center; background:#cfc;"
| 2015-07-04 || Win || align=left| Qiu Jianliang || Wu Lin Feng 2015 World 67 kg Tournament, final || Zhengzhou, China || Decision (Unanimous) || 3 || 3:00 
|-
! style=background:white colspan=9 |Wins the Wu Lin Feng 2015 World 67 kg Tournament Champions -67 kg.
|-  style="text-align:center; background:#cfc;"
| 2015-07-04 || Win || align=left| Jomthong Chuwattana || Wu Lin Feng 2015 World 67 kg Tournament, semi-finals || Zhengzhou, China || Ex.R Decision (Split) || 4 || 3:00
|- 
|-  style="text-align:center; background:#cfc;"
| 2015-06-26 || Win || align=left| Thodkhui MR.Manas || Silk Road Hero || Ürümqi, China || TKO || 2 ||
|-
|-  style="text-align:center; background:#fbb;"
| 2015-05-29 || Loss || align=left| Maurice Lohner || Wu Lin Feng 2015 & Day of Destruction 10 || Hamburg, Germany|| Decision (Unanimous) || 3 || 3:00 
|-
|-  style="text-align:center; background:#cfc;"
| 2015-04-04 || Win || align=left| Wang Pengfei || Wu Lin Feng 2015 World 67 kg Tournament, quarter final || Zhengzhou, China || TKO || 2 ||
|-
|-  style="text-align:center; background:#cfc;"
| 2015-04-04 || Win || align=left| Komiya Yukihiro || Wu Lin Feng 2015 World 67 kg Tournament, 1st round || Zhengzhou, China || Decision (Unanimous) || 3 || 3:00
|-
|-  style="text-align:center; background:#fbb;"
| 2015-01-31 || Loss || align=left| Khayal Dzhaniev || 2015 WLF World 8 Man Tournament −67 kg-semi finals || Chongqing, China || Decision (Unanimous) || 3 || 3:00 
|-
|-  style="text-align:center; background:#cfc;"
| 2015-01-31 || Win || align=left| Sandile Frans || 2015 WLF World 8 Man Tournament −67 kg-quarter finals || Chongqing, China || Decision (Unanimous) || 3 || 3:00
|-
|-  style="text-align:center; background:#cfc;"
| 2014-12-04 || Win || align=left| Beack Manseng || Kunlun Fight 14 || Bangkok, Thailand || KO || 3 ||
|-
|-  style="text-align:center; background:#cfc;"
| 2014-10-26 || Win || align=left| Phosa Nopphorn || Kunlun Fight 12 - Kunlun Fight 4 Man Tournament 65 kg-final || Jianshui, China || TKO || 3 || 
|-
! style=background:white colspan=9 |Wins the Kunlun Fight 4 Man Tournament 65 kg Champions -65 kg.
|-
|-  style="text-align:center; background:#cfc;"
| 2014-10-26 || Win || align=left| Matt Embree || Kunlun Fight 12 - Kunlun Fight 4 Man Tournament 65 kg-semi finals || Jianshui, China || Decision (Unanimous) || 3 || 3:00 
|-
|-  style="text-align:center; background:#cfc;"
| 2014-10-19 || Win || align=left| Felipe || I am National Hero || Zhengzhou, China || KO || 1 || 
|-
|-  style="text-align:center; background:#cfc;"
| 2014-10-05 || Win || align=left| Kim Dongsu || Kunlun Fight 11 || Macao, China || Ex.R Decision (Unanimous) || 4 || 3:00
|-
|-  style="text-align:center; background:#cfc;"
| 2014-08-30 || Win || align=left| Tie Yinghua || 2014 Wu Lin Feng World Championship -67 kg final  || Hong Kong, China || Ex.R Decision (Unanimous) || 4 || 3:00
|-
! style=background:white colspan=9 |Wins the 2014 WLF World Champion -67 kg.
|-  style="text-align:center; background:#cfc;"
| 2014-08-30 || Win || align=left| Victor Nagbe || 2014 Wu Lin Feng World Championship -67 kg semi-finals || Hong Kong, China || Decision (Unanimous) || 3 || 3:00 
|-
|-  style="text-align:center; background:#cfc;"
| 2014-08-16 || Win || align=left| Mishima ||Wu Lin Feng 2014 || Zhejiang, China || KO || 1 || 1:00
|-
|-  style="text-align:center; background:#fbb;"
| 2014-08-12 || Loss || align=left| Sangnapha Tor Saengtiennoi || Wu Lin Feng & Thailand Queen's Cup 2014  || Bangkok, Thailand || Decision (Unanimous) || 3 || 3:00
|-
|-  style="text-align:center; background:#cfc;"
| 2014-07-18 || Win || align=left| Shaman || Wu Lin Feng 2014 || Dingyuan, China || Decision (Unanimous) || 3 || 3:00
|-
|-  style="text-align:center; background:#cfc;"
| 2014-06-20 || Win || align=left| Ardang || I am National Hero || Xuchang, China || Decision (Unanimous) || 3 || 3:00 
|-
|-  style="text-align:center; background:#cfc;"
| 2014-05-24 || Win || align=left| Calogero Palmeri || Wu Lin Feng & Yokkao 9  || Xinyang, China || Decision (Unanimous) || 3 || 3:00 
|- 
|-  style="text-align:center; background:#fbb;"
| 2014-04-14 || Loss || align=left| Andrei Kulebin || Combat Banchamek || Surin, Thailand || Decision (unanimous) || 3 || 3:00
|-
|-  style="text-align:center; background:#cfc;"
| 2014-03-30 || Win || align=left| Kome || I am National Hero || Pingdingshan, China || Decision (Unanimous) || 3 || 3:00 
|-
|-  style="text-align:center; background:#cfc;"
| 2014-03-15 || Win || align=left| Ambrose Smac || Wu Lin Feng || Auckland, New Zealand || Decision (Unanimous) || 3 || 3:00
|-
|-  style="text-align:center; background:#cfc;"
| 2013-10-28 || Win || align=left| Pongthong Jetsada || Kunlun Fight-Beijing media promotion special fight-Final || Beijing, China || Decision (Unanimous) || 3 || 3:00
|-
|-  style="text-align:center; background:#cfc;"
| 2013-10-28 || Win || align=left|  || Kunlun Fight-Beijing media promotion special fight-Semi finals || Beijing, China || TKO (3 Knockdowns) || 2 || 
|-
|-  style="text-align:center; background:#cfc;"
| 2013-09-28 || Win || align=left| Chairit Neephonkrang || Wu Lin Feng || Shenzhen, China || Decision (Unanimous) || 3 || 3:00
|-
|-  style="text-align:center; background:#cfc;"
| 2013-08-16 || Win || align=left| Picken || Wu Lin Feng || Hami, Xinjiang, China  || Decision (Unanimous) || 3 || 3:00
|-
|-  style="text-align:center; background:#cfc;"
| 2013-04-13 || Win || align=left| Mika || Wu Lin Feng || Zhejiang, China || Decision (Unanimous) || 3 || 3:00
|-
|-  style="text-align:center; background:#cfc;"
| 2013-03-23 || Win || align=left| Pittle || Wu Lin Feng || Zhengzhou, China || KO (left low kick) || 1 ||
|-
|-  style="text-align:center; background:#cfc;"
| 2012-12-09 || Win || align=left| Harphyayak Chuwattana || Real - Real Fight MMA Championship 1 Kickboxing match || Zhengzhou, China || TKO (Punch)  || 3 ||
|-
|-  style="text-align:center; background:#fbb;"
| 2012-09-21 || Loss || align=left| Zheng Zhaoyu || Wu Lin Feng || Anhui, China || Decision (Unanimous) || 3 || 3:00
|-
|-  style="text-align:center; background:#fbb;"
| 2011-08-06 || Loss || align=left| Zhang Zhen || Wu Lin Feng || Henan, China || Decision || 3 || 3:00
|-
|-  style="text-align:center; background:#fbb;"
| 2011-04-16 || Loss || align=left| Zhou Jiankun || Wu Lin Feng || Henan, China || Decision || 3 || 3:00
|-
|-  style="text-align:center; background:#c5d2ea;"
| 2011-05-01 || Draw ||align=left| Armin Pumpanmuang || Wu Lin Feng ||Nanchang China  || Ex.R Decision || 4 || 3:00
|-
|-  style="text-align:center; background:#cfc;"
| 2011-04-23 || Win || align=left| Zhang Jingxong ||  WBC Muaythai || Nanning, China || TKO || 1 ||
|-
|-  style="text-align:center; background:#fbb;"
| 2011-03-05 || Loss || align=left| An Ruxin || Wu Lin Feng || Henan, China || Decision || 3 || 3:00
|-
|-  style="text-align:center; background:#fbb;"
| 2011-01-15 || Loss || align=left| Lee Su-Hwan || Wu Lin Feng || Henan, China || Decision || 3 || 3:00
|-
|-  style="text-align:center; background:#cfc;"
| 2010-12-06 || Win || align=left| Tie Yinghua || Wu Lin Feng || Zhengzhou, China || KO (Punch) || 2 ||
|-
|-  style="text-align:center; background:#cfc;"
| 2010-10-30 || Win || align=left| Chen Daben || Wu Lin Feng || Las Vegas, Nevada, USA || Decision || 3 || 3:00
|-
|-  style="text-align:center; background:#cfc;"
| 2010-09-18 || Win || align=left| Pan Guoshui || Wu Lin Feng || Zhengzhou, China || Decision || 3 || 3:00
|-
|-  style="text-align:center; background:#fbb;"
| 2010-05-01 || Loss || align=left| Shane Oblonsky || Wu Lin Feng || Henan, China || Decision || 3 || 3:00
|-
|-  style="text-align:center; background:#fbb;"
| 2010-03-29 || Loss || align=left| Vuyisile Colossa || Wu Lin Feng || Henan, China || Decision || 3 || 3:00
|-
|-  style="text-align:center; background:#cfc;"
| 2009-11-11 || Win || align=left| Kang Xin || Battlefield X1 || Beijing, China || TKO || 2 || 
|-
|-  style="text-align:center; background:#fbb;"
| 2009-10-17 || Loss || align=left| Jiang Zhenghui || Wu Lin Feng || Zhengzhou, China || Decision (Unanimous) || 3 || 3:00 
|-
|-  style="text-align:center; background:#cfc;"
| 2009-06-19 || Win || align=left| Samranchai 96PEENANG ||Wu Lin Feng || Zhengzhou, China || Decision (Unanimous) || 3 || 3:00 
|-
|-
| colspan=9 | Legend:

Mixed martial arts record

|-
|Win
|align=center| 3–2
|Alexander Ogawa
|TKO (Punches)
|Real - Real Fight MMA Championship 3
|
|align=center| 1
|align=center| 0:25
|Beijing, China
|
|-
|Win
|align=center| 2–2
|Sardorbek Qodirov
|Submission (Guillotine Choke)
|WLF MMA Championship Dubai 2013
|
|align=center| 2
|align=center| 
|Dubai, United Arab Emirates
|
|-
|Loss
|align=center| 1–2
|Jonny Gilbertson
|Decision (Unanimous)
|Real - Real Fight MMA Championship 2
|
|align=center| 3
|align=center| 5:00
|Zhengzhou, China
|
|-
|Loss
|align=center| 1–1
|Kairat Akhmetov
|Submission (Rear-Naked Choke)
|AP - Alash Pride 2
|
|align=center| 1
|align=center| 1:30
|Almaty, Kazakhstan
| 
|-
|Win
|align=center| 1–0
|Kenny Yeung
|Submission (Rear-Naked Choke)
|Legend FC - Legend Fighting Championship 3
|
|align=center| 3
|align=center| 4:05
|Hong Kong, China
|

References 

Chinese male kickboxers
Chinese male mixed martial artists
Lightweight kickboxers
Featherweight kickboxers
Mixed martial artists utilizing sanshou
1989 births
Living people
Kunlun Fight kickboxers
Chinese sanshou practitioners
Sportspeople from Liaoning
People from Dalian
Kunlun Fight kickboxing champions